Evert van der Heijden (15 October 1900 – 27 December 1959) was a Dutch footballer. He played in eight matches for the Netherlands national football team from 1929 to 1931.

References

External links
 

1900 births
1959 deaths
Dutch footballers
Netherlands international footballers
Place of birth missing
Association footballers not categorized by position